Aylín Mújica Ricard more commonly known as Aylín Mújica ( born November 24, 1974) is a Cuban actress, model, and ballet dancer who lives in Miami, Florida, United States.

Career 
Aylín began at the age of 8 years old. She studied folk dance, classical ballet, choreography, and music at la Escuela Nacional de Ballet. At 18 years old she began studying at el Instituto Superior de Artes where she studied dramatic art and at 18 years old she studied at la Escuela Internacional de Cine in Havana, Cuba.

In 1992 she traveled to Mexico to start her career. She started to work as a model in commercials for television and videoclips for artists such as Marcelo Cezán, Willy Chirino, Albita Rodríguez, and others.

The actress  posed nude in the Spanish magazine Interviú and appeared in a photoshoot in the magazine H para Hombres. In 2010 nude photos came out of her in which she was already pregnant with her daughter Violeta.

In 2006, the actress began working for Telemundo. She was offered the role of the villain in Pecados ajenos, but declined and was replaced by Catherine Siachoque. She worked in the Telemundo soap opera "Aurora" in 2010.

In 2012 she played the main antagonist in Telemundo's Corazón valiente, interpreting Fernanda del Castillo or Victoria when she faked her death.

In 2014 she played the antagonist to Gabriel Porras in the soap opera Los miserables, whose main characters were Aracely Arambula y Erik Hayser.

Personal life
On September 24, 2010, Mújica married actor Gabriel Valenzuela with whom she has a daughter, Violeta, born on April 6, 2010. During the summer of 2012 Aylin and Gabriel announced their divorce.

Filmography

Awards

ACE Awards

Golden Sun Awards

New York Latin ACE Awards 1999

Your World Awards

Premios People en Español

Miami Life Awards

References

External links 

 Telemundo Website
 Official "Sin Senos No Hay Paraíso" Website
Aylín Mújica at Notas.com
Aylín Mújica at Alma Latina

Living people
1974 births
People from Havana
Cuban people of Basque descent
Cuban television actresses
Cuban telenovela actresses
Cuban emigrants to the United States